Caseopsis is an extinct genus of large pelycosaurs that was about  long. Caseopsis lived in the late Early Permian epoch (Kungurian Age), before the pelycosaurs were replaced by the more advanced therapsids (in the next age). It  was a lightly built, agile creature. It may have been possible for this species to outpace and escape large predators such as Dimetrodon.

See also
 List of pelycosaurs

References

 Kungurian life

Caseasaurs
Prehistoric synapsid genera
Cisuralian synapsids of North America
Taxa named by Everett C. Olson
Fossil taxa described in 1962
Kungurian genus first appearances
Kungurian genus extinctions